George Nickerson Clements (October 5, 1940 – August 30, 2009) was an American theoretical linguist specializing in phonology.

Career 
Clements was born in Cincinnati, Ohio, and educated in New Haven, Paris and London. He received his Ph.D. from the School of Oriental and African Studies, University of London, in 1973, defending a thesis on the Ewe language based on a year of field work in Ghana.  He was a visiting scientist at M.I.T. (1973–75) and held appointments as professor at Harvard (1975–82) and Cornell (1982–91) before moving to the Centre National de la Recherche Scientifique (C.N.R.S.) in Paris in 1992.

Clements' main research was in phonology with a special focus on African languages. He is best known for his research in syllable theory, tone and feature theory which have contributed to the modern theory of sound patterning in spoken language. At the time of his death, his work was concerned with the principles underlying speech sound inventories across languages (Clements & Ridouane 2011).

Personal 
He was married to French linguist, Annie Rialland. He died of cancer in Chatham, Massachusetts, at the age of 68.

Books
 Clements, G. N. & S. J. Keyser, 1983.  CV Phonology: a Generative Theory of the Syllable  (Linguistic Inquiry Monograph 9), MIT Press, Cambridge, Ma.
 Halle, Morris & G. N. Clements, 1983. Problem Book in Phonology. Cambridge, Ma.: MIT Press and Bradford Books. 
 Clements, G. N. & J. Goldsmith, eds., 1984. Autosegmental Studies in Bantu Tone.  Berlin: Mouton de Gruyter
 Clements, G. N. & R. Ridouane, eds., 2011. Where do phonological features come from? Cognitive, physical and developmental bases of distinctive speech categories. John Benjamins Publishing Company: Amsterdam.

Other selected publications
 Clements, G. N., 1985. "The Geometry of Phonological Features," Phonology Yearbook 2, 225-252
 Clements, G. N., 1990. "The Role of the Sonority Cycle in Core Syllabification." In John Kingston & M. Beckman, eds., Papers in Laboratory Phonology I,  Cambridge: Cambridge University Press, Cambridge, MA, pp. 283–333
 Clements, G. N. & Elizabeth Hume, 1995. "The Internal Organization of Speech Sounds"  In John Goldsmith, ed., Handbook of Phonological Theory.  Oxford: Basil Blackwell, Oxford, pp. 245–306
 Clements, G. N., 2003. "Feature Economy in Sound Systems", Phonology 20.3, pp. 287–333
 Clements, G. N. & Annie Rialland, 2008. "Africa as a phonological area".  In Bernd Heine & Derek Nurse, eds, A Linguistic Geography of Africa.  Cambridge: Cambridge University Press, pp. 36–85.

References

External links 
 Nick Clements's personal webpage
 Remembering G. Nick Clements

1940 births
2009 deaths
Linguists from the United States
Harvard University faculty
Cornell University faculty
Phonologists
20th-century linguists